Rob Palmer (born 15 April 1975) is an Australian television presenter. He is best known for presenting the Do It Yourself segments on several lifestyle programs on the Seven Network.He is currently a presenter on 107.7 Triple M Central Coast.

Career
Palmer appeared on Channel Seven's Room For Improvement program (2001-2003), and also on the short-lived House Calls to the Rescue.

In 2004, he became the DIY section presenter on Better Homes and Gardens. At the end of December 2014, it was reported that his contract with Channel Seven was not renewed.

He won the 10th season of Dancing with the Stars in 2010.

Personal life
Palmer married British former television presenter Gwenllian Jones in 2003. , they have one son and two daughters. He has type 1 diabetes, diagnosed when he was aged seven.
Grew up in the Hills District of Sydney NSW.
Attended:  St Michaels Catholic Primary @ Baulkham Hills.
High School;  St Ignatius College Riverview.

References

Living people
Australian television presenters
Dancing with the Stars (Australian TV series) winners
People educated at Saint Ignatius' College, Riverview
1975 births